Jung von Matt (JvM) is an advertising agency headquartered in Hamburg, Germany, with 24 affiliates in Germany, Austria, Switzerland, Sweden, China, Poland and the Czech Republic. Jung von Matt is the second biggest owner-run German advertising agency, behind Serviceplan.

Key personnel 

Jung von Matt was founded in 1991 by Holger Jung and Jean-Remy von Matt in Hamburg. Peter Figge, Jean-Remy von Matt, Larissa Pohl, Thomas Strerath and Götz Ulmer are co-CEOs.

Awards 

Between 2008 and 2012, the so-called Kreativ-Index of the German Manager magazine ranked Jung von Matt as the most creative German advertising agency.
In 2012, JvM won four Golden Trophies at the European Design & Advertising Art Directors Club of Europe Awards in Barcelona.
In the same year Jung von Matt was ranked No. 3 of Most Effective Independent Agency Offices in the worldwide Effie Effectiveness Index. In 2015 the agency won a total of eight trophies at the AME Award in New York (Advertising & Marketing Effectiveness). Among them was the Grand Trophy for the "Trojan Mailing." In 2018, Jung von Matt earned the title Agency of the Year at the Lovie Awards, a prestigious pan-European honor for online excellence.

Controversies 	

The customer of this advertisement EDEKA was officially reprimanded by the German Advertising Standards Authority (Deutscher Werberat) for breaching advertising standards.

References

External links 
 Official website Jung von Matt

Further reading 

 Holger Jung, Jean-Remy von Matt Momentum – Die Kraft, die Werbung heute braucht. Lardon Verlag, 2004,  (German)
 Jean Remy von Matt, Holger Jung: Stimmen aus dem Aquarium! Schmidt (Hermann), Mainz 2008,  (German)
 Heide Neukirchen: Wer hat's erfunden? Die Geheimnisse von Europas einflussreichster Werbeagentur – Jung von Matt. Redline Verlag, München 2011,  (German)

Advertising agencies of Germany
Mass media in Hamburg